The 2014 ATP Shenzhen Open was a professional men's tennis tournament played on hard courts. This was the inaugural edition of the tournament, which was part of the ATP World Tour 250 series of the 2014 ATP World Tour.  It took place at the Shenzhen Longgang Tennis Centre in Shenzhen, China from September 22 to September 28.

Singles main draw entrants

Seeds

 1 Rankings are as of September 15, 2014

Other entrants
The following players received wildcards into the singles main draw:
  Gao Xin
  Egor Gerasimov
  Andy Murray

The following players received entry from the qualifying draw:
  Martin Kližan
  Thanasi Kokkinakis
  Ouyang Bowen
  Viktor Troicki

Withdrawals
Before the tournament
  Roberto Bautista Agut
  Guillermo García-López
  Tobias Kamke
  Blaž Kavčič
  Donald Young
  Mikhail Youzhny

Retirements
 Martin Kližan (wrist pain)

Doubles main draw entrants

Seeds

 1 Rankings are as of September 15, 2014

Other entrants 
The following pairs received wildcards into the doubles main draw:
  Ouyang Bowen /  Wang Aoran
  Qiu Zhuoyang /  Te Rigele
The following pair received entry as alternates:
  Marco Chiudinelli /  Lukáš Lacko

Withdrawals
Before the tournament
  Richard Gasquet (right elbow injury)

Champions

Singles

  Andy Murray defeated  Tommy Robredo, 5–7, 7–6(11–9), 6–1

Doubles

  Jean-Julien Rojer /  Horia Tecău defeated  Sam Groth /  Chris Guccione, 6–4, 7–6(7–4)

References

External links
Official site 

ATP Shenzhen Open
ATP Shenzhen Open
ATP Shenzhen Open
ATP Shenzhen Open